Louis-Eugène Bion (born in Paris on 12 April 1807, died in Versailles on 21 January 1860), is a French sculptor. He was a student of Antoine Desbœuf and, after obtaining an entry in the contest of 1830, he especially performed to the religious sculpture.

Main works
 La Poésie chrétienne
 Saint Vincent de Paul
 Sainte Famille
 Saint Jean l'Évangéliste
 Chaire, Église de Brou
 Le Pape Alexandre II distribuant de l'eau bénite, Church Saint-Eustache of Paris

References 

1807 births
1860 deaths
Artists from Paris
19th-century French sculptors
French male sculptors
19th-century French male artists